Issam Lahyani is a Tunisian handball coach of the Tunisian national team, which he coached at the 2017 World Women's Handball Championship.

References

Living people
Tunisian handball coaches
Year of birth missing (living people)